The Vita Machometi is a Latin biography of Muḥammad written by a certain Adelphus in the early to mid-12th century. Nothing is known of the author but what he reveals about himself in the Vita. This includes that he had heard the Muslim call to prayer and had conversed with a Greek about Islam while staying in Antioch on a return trip from Jerusalem. Taken together, these facts suggest that he may have been a participant in the First Crusade. He seems to have had a biblical and classical education. He may have been a Benedictine abbot.

The Vita is a polemical account of Muḥammad's life based, so Adelphus claims, on the account of the Greek from Antioch. It contains a mixture of actual knowledge of Islam and imaginary and folkloric accounts of its origins. Adelphus had clear misgivings about his information and sought to blame "the inventiveness of the Greeks". The Vita relates that Muḥammad was a swineherd led by an evil spirit to seek out the heretical monk Nestorius (probably intended to refer to the Patriarch Nestorius). The latter teaches him magic and necromancy. They create a new holy book—the Qurʾān—by corrupting the Bible, although Adelphus does not describe their doctrines in detail. They present Muḥammad as a new prophet and produce fake miracles. Muḥammad marries the "queen of Babylon". To take over the leadership of the movement, he murders Nestorius and frames a bodyguard. Since the murder took place while all were drunk, he bans alcohol. While out hunting one day, Muḥammad is attacked and eaten by pigs, which is why Muslims refuse to eat pork.

The Vita Machometi contains many parallels to the 11th-century Latin life of Muḥammad by Embrico of Mainz. The murder of Muḥammad's tutor is also found in the account of William of Tripoli. Like Guibert of Nogent, Adelphus portrays Islam as the latest in a succession of Christian heresies arising in the east, like monophysitism and Nestorianism. In addition to these western influences, he includes material borrowed from eastern traditions.

The Vita Machometi was not widely read. The manuscript also contains the Historia de preliis and Berno of Reichenau's tonary.

Notes

Bibliography

12th-century Latin literature
12th-century Christian texts
Biographies of Muhammad
Latin biographies